Coche, a Spanish word for automobile, can refer to:

 Coche people, an indigenous people of Colombia
 Camsá language, Coche language
 Coche Island, Venezuela
 Coche station, a rapid transit station in Caracas
 Coche d'eau, a horse-drawn water coach, also called Trekschuit
 Coche, Al-Mada'in, the name of an ancient urban complex along the Tigris River in Iraq
 Chantal Coché (1826 – 1891), Belgian industrialist

Language and nationality disambiguation pages